Daizen (written:  or ) is a masculine Japanese given name. Notable people with the name include:

, Japanese footballer
, Japanese stunt double

Fictional characters
, a character in the light novel series Tokyo Ravens

See also
, Japanese sumo wrestler

Japanese masculine given names